Volcy is a surname. Notable people with the surname include:

Jean-Marc Volcy (born 1966), Seychellois composer, performer, and songwriter
Ricky Volcy (born 1982), Canadian basketball player